Jiang Zhigang (born August 1960) is a Chinese politician who served as deputy party secretary of Ningxia and party secretary of Yinchuan from 2017 to 2021.

He was a representative of the 19th National Congress of the Chinese Communist Party and an alternate member of the 19th Central Committee of the Chinese Communist Party.

Biography
Jiang was born in Donghai County, Jiangsu, in August 1960. After resuming the college entrance examination, in 1978, he entered Beihang University, where he majored in aerial equipment. 

After graduating in 1982, Jiang was despatched to Chengdu Aircraft Industry Company, and eventually becoming deputy general manager in December 1992. He joined the Chinese Communist Party (CCP) in August 1986. He was director of Human Resources Department of the China Aviation Industry Corporation I in September 1999 and subsequently deputy director of the 5th Bureau of Cadres of the Organization Department of the Chinese Communist Party in April 2001. He was appointed deputy director of the 1st Enterprise Leadership Administration Bureau of the State owned Assets Supervision and Administration Commission in May 2013, becoming deputy director of the 2nd Enterprise Leadership Administration Bureau in September 2003 and director of the 2nd Enterprise Leadership Administration Bureau in December 2003. He rose to become deputy director the State owned Assets Supervision and Administration Commission in October 2011.

In May 2013, he was appointed head of the Organization Department of the CCP Beijing Municipal Committee and was admitted to member of the Standing Committee of the CCP Beijing Municipal Committee, the city's top authority.

He was deputy party secretary of Ningxia in April 2017, in addition to serving as president of the Party School. Two months later, he concurrently served as party secretary of Yinchuan.

References

1960 births
Living people
People from Donghai County
Beihang University alumni
Northwestern Polytechnical University alumni
People's Republic of China politicians from Jiangsu
Chinese Communist Party politicians from Jiangsu
Alternate members of the 19th Central Committee of the Chinese Communist Party